"Sweet Lorraine" is a popular song with music by Cliff Burwell and words by Mitchell Parish that was published in 1928 and has become a jazz standard. It is written in F major and has an AABA structure.

A version by Teddy Wilson charted in October 1935, peaking at #17. Frank Sinatra recorded the song on December 17, 1946. His version was released as a single on Columbia Records (#37293) but did not chart. The Nat "King" Cole Trio recorded the song in 1956 and released it on the Capitol album After Midnight. It was also recorded by Donnie Brooks.

See also
List of 1920s jazz standards
Maureen Stapleton#Filmography (film Sweet Lorraine)

References

1928 songs
1920s jazz standards
Songs with lyrics by Mitchell Parish
Nat King Cole songs
Jazz compositions in F major
Bluebird Records singles
United States National Recording Registry recordings